Leonard Terry Strand (born July 14, 1965) is the Chief United States district judge of the United States District Court for the Northern District of Iowa and a former United States magistrate judge of the same court.

Education

Strand was born on July 14, 1965, raised in Sioux City, Iowa, and graduated from West High School as valedictorian. He received a Bachelor of Arts degree, with high distinction and Phi Beta Kappa, in 1987 from the University of Iowa. He received a Juris Doctor, with highest distinction, first in his class, and Order of the Coif, in 1990 from the University of Iowa College of Law. During law school, he worked at Vinson & Elkins in Houston and Simmons Perrine Moyer Bergman in Cedar Rapids and also contributed to The Journal of Corporation Law.

Legal career 
After graduating from law school, Strand joined Simmons Perrine Moyer Bergman as an associate. He was a partner at the firm from 1996 to 2012. During his service with the firm, he specialized in commercial litigation and employment law and served on the firm's management committee. He was also briefly an arbitrator for the American Arbitration Association.

Federal judicial service

United States magistrate judge service
From June 7, 2012, to February 12, 2016, Strand served as a United States magistrate judge for the Northern District of Iowa.

District court service 
On July 21, 2015, President Barack Obama, at the recommendation of Senator Chuck Grassley, nominated Strand to serve as a United States District Judge of the United States District Court for the Northern District of Iowa, to the seat vacated by Judge Mark W. Bennett, who assumed senior status on June 4, 2015.  He received a hearing before the United States Senate Judiciary Committee on October 21, 2015. On November 5, 2015, his nomination was reported out of committee by voice vote.  Strand's home state senator, Chuck Grassley, brokered a deal for Strand's confirmation by the Senate: in exchange for Democrats' votes for Strand and Rebecca Goodgame Ebinger, Grassley's committee would advance three liberal nominees. On February 11, 2016, the United States Senate confirmed his nomination by a 93–0 vote. He received his commission on February 12, 2016. Strand's investiture occurred on April 21, 2016. He became Chief Judge on February 12, 2017.

References

External links

1965 births
Living people
Iowa lawyers
Judges of the United States District Court for the Northern District of Iowa
People from Sioux City, Iowa
United States district court judges appointed by Barack Obama
United States magistrate judges
University of Iowa College of Law alumni
21st-century American judges